The Sweden men's national floorball team is the national floorball team of Sweden, and a member of the International Floorball Federation. It has won ten out of 14 men's world championships (1996, 1998, 2000, 2002, 2004, 2006, 2012, 2014, 2020 and 2022). Its dominance has decreased somewhat though – in 1996 the overall goal difference was 83–3, while ten years later, the team suffered its first draw in the tournament versus Switzerland, and needed sudden victory to defeat Finland in the final. In 2008, Finland defeated Sweden in overtime, giving Sweden its first loss in the World Floorball Championships. This loss happened in the final match, and therefore Sweden did not retain their 12-year title as world floorball champions. In 2012, Sweden defeated Finland and won the title for the first time in six years.

Current roster
The roster for the 2020 WFC in Helsinki

World Championships Record

Rankings and records

Rankings

All-time World Championship records

References

External links
 
 Team page on IFF site

Floorball in Sweden
Men's
Sweden
F